Björn Brönnum (born 16 September 1929) is a Danish rower. He competed at the 1952 Summer Olympics in Helsinki with the men's eight where they were eliminated in the semi-finals repêchage.

References

 

1929 births
Possibly living people
Danish male rowers
Olympic rowers of Denmark
Rowers at the 1952 Summer Olympics
Sportspeople from Frederiksberg
European Rowing Championships medalists